California Ethnic and Multicultural Archives (CEMA) is an archival institution that houses collections of primary source documents from the history of minority ethnic groups in California. The documents, which include manuscripts, slide photographs, newspaper clippings, works of art, journals, film, sound recordings, and other ephemera, are housed in the special collections department of the UCSB Libraries at the University of California, Santa Barbara, where they are made accessible to researchers upon request. An effort is currently underway to make certain documents available online through the Online Archive of California.

History
CEMA was founded in 1988 by Joseph A. Boissé and Salvador Güereña, both UCSB librarians. The library already had a substantial collection of primary and secondary-sources in the Colección Tloque Nahuaque, a library of Chicano studies materials, and the need for special resources to preserve and catalogue
primary resources became apparent. The primary resources, which at that time consisted primarily of silkscreen posters from the Chicano art movement, were transferred from the ethnic and gender studies library to the department of special collections.

Güereña began the acquisition of other collections immediately, and today CEMA is the repository for over 100 collections from each of the four main ethnic groups in California: Latinos, Asian Americans, African American, and Native Americans, although Mexican American collections still outnumber collections from the other groups.

Projects
In 2001, CEMA was selected by the Online Archive of California, an internet resource, to supply digital images of Chicano art from its extensive photographic collections as part of California's contribution to the Congressionally-mandated American Memory project to preserve and increase the accessibility of documents from American history. Since that time, CEMA has provided over 7,000 digital images for the project.

Collections
CEMA's collections include the archives of artistic, political, and professional organizations, as well as the papers of individual artists, musicians, activists, and writers, many of whom were active in the Chicano, anti-war, and civil rights movements. Notable collections include:
Organizations

Asian American Theater Company
Black Panther Party (San Francisco Bay Area)
Católicos por la Raza
Centro Cultural de la Raza
Comisión Femenil Mexicana Nacional
Galería de la Raza
Kearny Street Workshop
MEChA
REFORMA
Royal Chicano Air Force
Self Help Graphics & Art
Teatro Campesino

Individuals

Oscar Zeta Acosta
Ana Castillo
Iris Chang
Frank Chin
Ricardo Cruz
Adelina García
Lalo Guerrero
Yolanda Lopez
Miguel Méndez
José Montoya
Rini Templeton
Don Tosti
Maria Helena Viramontes
Nellie Wong

References

Archives in the United States
California culture
Ethnic museums in California
Geographic region-oriented digital libraries
Historiography of California
Mexican-American culture in California
Mexican-American history
Multiculturalism in the United States
University of California, Santa Barbara
American digital libraries